Fabio Gadea Mantilla (born November 9, 1931 in Ocotal, Nueva Segovia) is a Nicaraguan radio journalist, writer, and politician. He is owner and co-founder of the news radio station Radio Corporación. He also represents Nicaragua as deputy to the Central American Parliament and was President of that body in 2004–2005, as well as having been a member of its Commission of Education, Culture, Sports, Science, and Technology from 2007 onward.

In 2010, he was nominated to run as a candidate for President of Nicaragua in the November 2011 general election.

In November 2011 he lost the election to Daniel Ortega of the FSLN.

External links
 Quién es Quién en el Parlamento Centroamericano y en la Asamblea Nacional, Diputados Electos Período 2007–2011 Hagamos Democracia, Nicaragua. (In Spanish) (Biographical article; scroll to p 25–26.)
 Fabio es el creador del personaje by Edgard E. Martínez, Aqui Nicaragua. (In Spanish) (Biographical article.)
 Column archive at Radio Corporación (In Spanish)
 "Fabio Gadea Mantilla acepta la casilla 13 del PLI", La Prensa, December 27, 2010. (In Spanish)
 "La carta de don Fabio", La Prensa, August 15, 2010. (In Spanish)
 "¿Que encierra la candidatura de Fabio Gadea Mantilla?" by Sebastián Chavarría Domínguez, El Socialista Centroamerica, September 4, 2010. (In Spanish)

1931 births
Living people
People from Nueva Segovia Department
Independent Liberal Party (Nicaragua) politicians
Nicaraguan journalists
Nicaraguan short story writers
Male short story writers
Nicaraguan male writers
Radio journalists
Male journalists
20th-century short story writers
21st-century short story writers
20th-century male writers
21st-century male writers
20th-century Nicaraguan writers
21st-century Nicaraguan writers
Presidents of Central American Parliament